Deadly Lessons (also known as Highschool Killer) is a 1983 American made-for-television horror film starring Donna Reed, Larry Wilcox, David Ackroyd, Diane Franklin, Ally Sheedy, and Nancy Cartwright. The film premiered on ABC on March 7, 1983.

Plot
A teenaged girl, Stephanie Aggiston, is sent to Starkwater Hall Boarding School, a prestigious private girl's academy, for the summer to brush up on advanced French. Stephanie is a country girl and finds the school to be a bit snobbish. She makes friends with Marita Armstrong, Calli and Shama, who is a Saudi princess and her roommate.

Murders began occurring and Det. Russ Kemper comes to investigate. As more girls are killed, everyone worries about who will be next. Stephanie attempts to find the murderer herself. She enlists the help of the new attractive stable boy, Eddie Fox, who falls in love with her for 'not being like the other girls.' Suspicion soon falls on Eddie as the murderer.

As the summer progresses, the girls are slowly evacuated from the school. Marita is kidnapped on the day she is set to leave by the school's janitor, Robert Hartigan. Robert binds and gags Marita in his quarters on campus, somehow deluded into thinking his daughter was Marita's mother (which is not true). When Marita is able to signal for help from her captivity, Stephanie has Kemper follow her as she heads out "alone" to attract Robert's attention, allowing Kemper to make an arrest and save Marita.

Later, Stephanie is ambushed and chased by a mysterious figure, dressed all in black. The person is revealed to be Kemper, the real killer. The first death, Tember Logan, was an accident, as she drowned. It gave Kemper the idea to kill the other victims as a means of getting revenge on Miss Wade, who is revealed to be his mother, for abandoning him as a child. The murders were a means of ruining the reputations of both the school and her. He is apprehended and taken away.

Cast
 Donna Reed as Miss Wade, School's Headmistress
 Larry Wilcox as Detective Russ Kemper
 David Ackroyd as John Ferrar
 Diane Franklin as Stephanie Aggiston
 Ally Sheedy as Marita Armstrong
 Donald Hotton as Robert Hartigan
 Deena Freeman as Lauren Peele
 Vicki Kriegler as Shama
 Krista Errickson as Tember Logan
 Bill Paxton as Eddie Fox
 Renée Jones as Calli
 Nancy Cartwright as Libby Dean
 Robin Gammell as Morgan Rank
 Rick Rossovich as Craig
 Ellen Geer as Mrs. Grant

External links

1983 television films
1983 films
1983 horror films
ABC network original films
American horror television films
American teen horror films
1980s teen horror films
1980s high school films
American high school films
Films directed by William Wiard
1980s American films